= Eduardo Firpi =

Eduardo Firpi (1951–2011) was a Colombian-Puerto Rican photographer. His work has been featured on National Geographic.
